The squacco heron (Ardeola ralloides) is a small heron,  long, of which the body is , with  wingspan. It is of Old World origins, breeding in southern Europe and the Greater Middle East.

Behaviour

The squacco heron is a migrant, wintering in Africa. It is rare north of its breeding range. The species has been recorded in Fernando de Noronha islands, and more rarely in mainland South America, as a vagrant. This is a stocky species with a short neck, short thick bill and buff-brown back. In summer, adults have long neck feathers. Its appearance is transformed in flight, when it looks very white due to the colour of the wings.

The squacco heron's breeding habitat is marshy wetlands in warm countries. The birds nest in small colonies, often with other wading birds, usually on platforms of sticks in trees or shrubs. Three to four eggs are laid. They feed on fish, frogs and insects.

Etymology
The English common name squacco comes via Francis Willughby (c. 1672) quoting a local Italian name sguacco. The current spelling comes from John Hill in 1752.

The scientific name comes from Latin ardeola, a small heron (ardea), and ralloides, Latin rallus, a rail and Greek -oides, "resembling".

Breeding 
The Squacco Heron uses freshwater localities throughout Europe and the Middle East as breeding grounds to later migrate south to the Sub-Saharan African region. Non-breeding Squacco Herons share similar traits with other heron species like the Indian Pond Heron and Malagasy Pond Heron which show tawny color plumage, lighter streaking, smaller bill, and narrower wing tips.

References

External links

Squacco Heron - The Atlas of Southern African Birds

Squacco Heron at oiseaux.net

squacco heron
squacco heron
squacco heron
Birds of Africa
Birds of Europe
Birds of Western Asia